The speckled antshrike or spiny-faced antshrike (Xenornis setifrons) is a species of bird in the family Thamnophilidae. It is the only member of the genus Xenornis. It is found in Panama and far northwestern Colombia.

Its natural habitats are subtropical or tropical moist lowland forest and subtropical or tropical moist montane forest.
It is threatened by habitat loss.

References

External links
BirdLife Species Factsheet.

speckled antshrike
Birds of Panama
speckled antshrike
Taxonomy articles created by Polbot